The domain name is a generic top-level domain (gTLD) in the Domain Name System of the Internet. It is intended for use by individuals for representation of their personal name, nicknames, screen names, pseudonyms, or other types of identification labels.

History
The top-level domain was founded by Hakon Haugnes and Geir Rasmussen and initially delegated to Global Name Registry in 2001, and become fully operational in January 2002. Verisign was the outsourced operator for .name since the .name launch in 2002 and acquired Global Name Registry in 2008.

In late September 2007, security researchers accused Global Name Registry of harboring hackers by charging fees per WHOIS lookup. The policy of selling detailed registration info about domains in name for US$2 each was criticized as hindering community efforts to locate and clean up malware-spreading hosts, zombies, and botnet control servers located in name. The registry offers unlimited lookups to approved users who sign a 10-page legal agreement.

In November 2009, internationalized domain names (IDNs) became available for second- and third-level domain names. IDNs are domain names that are represented by user applications in the native character set of a language.

Structure
When the TLD name was first launched, only third-level registrations and forwarded e-mail addresses were available. Second-level registrations became available in January 2004.  The original intended structure of domain names was first.last.name, so that individuals could get a domain corresponding to their name.

The purpose of this sharing of second-level names was to ensure that the highest number of people possible could get an email address that included their last name. This sharing did not impact any other people with the same last name, and research by Global Name Registry showed that a majority of the world's population does not have an overlapping firstname–lastname combination.

Usage
Subdomains of name may be registered at the second-level (john.name) and the third-level (john.doe.name). It is also possible to register an e-mail address of the form john@doe.name. Email forwarding will be operated by Verisign.  The target address can be specified by an additional EPP mapping. The second-level domain of third-level subdomains is shared, and may not be registered by individuals.

The WHOIS service for name is available at whois.nic.name. Domain name registrations are available from accredited ICANN registrars.

See also
Domain name

References

External links
IANA .name whois information
.name operator  website (Verisign)
.name Registry Agreement

Generic top-level domains
Computer-related introductions in 2001

de:Top-Level-Domain#Nichtgesponserte Domains (uTLD)
sv:Toppdomän#Generiska toppdomäner